Gabriella Price (born 11 June 2003) is an American tennis player.

Price has career-high WTA rankings of 736 in singles, achieved on 28 June 2021, and 727 in doubles, set on 22 July 2019.

Price made her WTA main draw debut at the 2021 Ladies Open Lausanne, where she received a wildcard to the doubles main draw.

References

External links
 
 

2003 births
Living people
American female tennis players
21st-century American women